Safartuy was a rural locality (a khutor) in Ishimbaysky District of the Bashkir ASSR in the Russian SFSR, Soviet Union, located in the upper reaches of the Bolshoy Ryauzak River. It was abolished on December 11, 1987.

References

Ishimbaysky District
Former populated places in Russia
Populated places disestablished in 1987